Godspeed on the Devil's Thunder (subtitled The Life and Crimes of Gilles de Rais) is the eighth studio album by English extreme metal band Cradle of Filth. It was released on 28 October 2008, through record label Roadrunner. It is the band's fourth concept album, after Cruelty and the Beast (1998), Midian (2000), and Damnation and a Day (2003), dealing with the life of the 15th-century French baron Gilles de Rais.

Recording and production
The album was produced by Sabbat guitarist Andy Sneap, who had previously worked with Cradle of Filth while mixing the band's 2006 album, Thornography. Godspeed on the Devil's Thunder is Cradle of Filth's first album as a four-piece, rather than its usual six-man staple. It is also the last album to feature backing vocalist Sarah Jezebel Deva (although she briefly returned for Midnight in the Labyrinth in 2012) and the first to feature drummer Martin Škaroupka, replacing Adrian Erlandsson.

The band's official message boards revealed parts of an interview with guitarist Paul Allender, conducted by Média Matin Québec: "We already have four new songs ready and I have to say that they are... much faster than the songs on Thornography. [They] sound like old Cradle of Filth... A mixture of Midian and Dusk...." The interview goes on to state that the album will be followed by a European and American tour. Dani Filth has described the album as, "our most extreme, dramatic and deeply disturbing album to date. The legend of Gilles de Rais has been given fresh, vampyrical life in this conceptual meisterwerk, swathed in pitch-black magic and a viciousness unsurpassed in the annals of Cradle history. Screw what our detractors say, everyone who has heard this album has bruised their jaws on the pentagram-bejewelled floor."

In an interview with Blistering magazine, Filth revealed that three additional songs were recorded during the album sessions, among them an instrumental piece and a cover of Celtic Frost's "Into the Crypts of Rays". On the topic of their absence from the album, Filth has stated that they "were taken out so that the album wasn't too long. They'll turn up somewhere." They were ultimately included on the special edition.

Content
In an interview published in February 2009, Dani talked about Gilles de Rais, and how his story manifests on Godspeed on the Devil's Thunder:

The title of the album derives from a valediction vocalist Dani Filth once used to sign a letter.

Once again, Doug Bradley provides narration for the album (as with Midian, Nymphetamine and Thornography). The actor Tony Todd had initially been approached, but had quit the recording sessions over discomfort with the material.

Promotion and release
On 21 July 2008, the band revealed the title and track listing of the new album. The track "Tragic Kingdom", was made available for free download by Roadrunner Records on 27 August, while 30-second samples of each track on the album were made available on Amazon.de on 27 September. The track "Honey and Sulphur" was the album's first single, and has been made available for purchase on the iTunes Store. A music video for the song was filmed at the Chislehurst Caves of Kent. In addition, "Midnight Shadows Crawl to Darken Counsel with Life" was available for streaming on the band's official website.

Godspeed on the Devil's Thunder was released on 28 October. The album peaked at number 48 on the Billboard 200 chart, with sales of a little over 11,000 copies. It reached number 73 in the UK Albums Chart. A special edition containing a bonus disc was also released.

A video for "The Death of Love" was released on 31 July 2009. Andy Sneap has mixed a new version of the song for the video.

Critical reception 

Godspeed on the Devil's Thunder has been generally well received by critics. Terrorizer called it "A much more cohesive, consistent and convincing album than Cradle have made for ages... Too samey to justify 71 minutes, but ultimately this is cracking..." Kerrang! called it "Grandiose, epic but still feral... eclipses the relatively weak Thornography... mixes scorching dynamics, atmosphere and overblown theatrics..." Metal Hammer wrote that it "Ticks all the band's usual boxes, while also boasting genuine narrative depth and real emotional resonance... Cradle's heaviest album yet and their strongest set of songs..."

Track listing

Personnel 
 Cradle of Filth

 Dani Filth – vocals
 Paul Allender – guitars, recording of demo tracks
 Dave Pybus – bass
 Martin Škaroupka – drums
 Sarah Jezebel Deva – spoken voice, harmonies

 Additional personnel

 Mark Newby-Robson – keyboards
 Mark Harwood - engineering on demo tracks
 Carolyn Gretton – lead female vocals
 Stephen Svanholm – baritone voice
 Doug Bradley – lead narration
 Luna Scarlett Davey – narration
 Elissa Devins, Julie Devins, Leanne Harrison, Carolyn Gretton, Tonya Kay, Rachel Marshall-Clarke, Liz Willgoose, Laura Willgoose - choir

 Technical personnel

 Andy Sneap – producer, engineer, mixing, mastering
 Doug Cook – producer, engineer
 Scott Atkins – engineer, mixing of live tracks
 "Devil to the Metal" and "Courting Baphomet" produced by Rob Caggiano and Cradle of Filth, engineered by Dan Turner
 David Ho – album artwork
 Travis Smith - design
 Daragh McDonagh – sleeve photography
 Eternal Spirits – costumes in sleeve photography

Charts

References

External links 
 

2008 albums
Cradle of Filth albums
Albums produced by Andy Sneap
Roadrunner Records albums
Concept albums
Cultural depictions of Gilles de Rais